The 1987 Swiss Indoors was a men's tennis tournament played on indoor hard courts at the St. Jakobshalle in Basel, Switzerland that was part of the 1987 Nabisco Grand Prix circuit. It was the 18th edition of the tournament and took place from 5 October until 11 October 1987. First-seeded Yannick Noah won the singles title.

Finals

Singles

 Yannick Noah defeated  Ronald Agénor 7–6(8–6), 6–4, 6–4
 It was Noah's 2nd singles title of the year and the 21st of his career.

Doubles

 Anders Järryd /  Tomáš Šmíd defeated  Stanislav Birner /  Jaroslav Navrátil 6–4, 6–3

References

External links
 ITF tournament edition profile

Swiss Indoors
Swiss Indoors
1987 in Swiss tennis